The following lists events that happened in 1927 in Iceland.

Incumbents
Monarch - Kristján X
Prime Minister – Jón Þorláksson, Tryggvi Þórhallsson

Events
9 July – Icelandic parliamentary election, 1927
28 August – The Cabinet of Tryggvi Þórhallsson formed
1927 Úrvalsdeild

Births
2 February – Gísli Halldórsson, actor (d. 1998)
29 March – Jón Hnefill Aðalsteinsson, scholar and folklorist (d. 2010)
3 July – Salome Þorkelsdóttir, politician
14 September – Ari Guðmundsson, ski jumper (d. 2003)
8 October – Ívar Stefánsson, cross country skier (d. 2009)

Full date missing
Sigurdur Helgason, mathematician

Deaths

23 February – Sveinbjörn Sveinbjörnsson, composer (b. 1847).

References

 
1920s in Iceland
Iceland
Iceland
Years of the 20th century in Iceland